Events from the year 1941 in art.

Events
March 17 – In Washington, D.C., the National Gallery of Art is officially opened by President Franklin D. Roosevelt.
July 14 – American art collector Peggy Guggenheim and German painter Max Ernst arrive in New York City, fleeing occupied Europe.
August – Evacuated paintings from the National Gallery in London are moved to underground storage at a slate quarry beneath Manod Mawr in North Wales.
October 24 – English artist Brian Stonehouse is captured as a Special Operations Executive agent in France.
October 31 – Work ceases on sculpting Mount Rushmore National Memorial in the United States, continued by Lincoln Borglum after the death in March of his father Gutzon Borglum.
December 8 – The exhibition American Negro Art: Nineteenth and Twentieth Centuries opens in Edith Halpert's Downtown Gallery in New York City.
December 30 – Peggy Guggenheim marries the exiled Max Ernst in Virginia.
 Ettore DeGrazia's work appears for the first time in Arizona Highways magazine.
 African-American painter Jacob Lawrence completes his Migration Series.
 German-Jewish painter Charlotte Salomon, in hiding in the south of France, begins the autobiographical series of paintings Leben? oder Theater?: Ein Singspiel ("Life? or Theater?: A Song-play").
 Indiana University Art Museum established in Bloomington.
 The Art Center in La Jolla established in California.

Awards
 Archibald Prize: William Dargie – Sir James Elder, KBE

Works

 Ansel Adams – Moonrise, Hernandez, New Mexico (photograph)
 Ethel V. Ashton – Defenders of the Wyoming Country 1778 (United States post office mural, Tunkhannock, Pennsylvania)
 Max Beckmann – Double Portrait, Max Beckmann and Quappi
 Peter Belov – 1941 ("Large Stalin and Red Army")
 Paul Cadmus – Aviator
 Paul Delvaux – The Phases of the Moon
 A. E. Doyle and Associates – Loyal B. Stearns Memorial Fountain (Portland, Oregon)
 Sir Russell Drysdale – Moody's pub
 Jacob Epstein – Jacob and the Angel (alabaster sculpture, 1940–1)
 Ivon Hitchens
 Damp Autumn
 Interior, Boy in Bed
 Edward Hopper – Girlie Show
 Marcel Jean - Armoire Surréaliste
 Yousuf Karsh – The Roaring Lion (photographic portrait of Winston Churchill)
 Dame Laura Knight – In For Repairs
 Alonzo Victor Lewis – Dr. Mark A. Matthews (bronze bust, Denny Park (Seattle))
 Musa McKim – Wildlife in White Mountain and Philip Guston – Pulp Wood Logging (murals at Federal Building (Laconia, New Hampshire))
 Roberto Matta
 Composition Abstraite
 Ecouter Vivre
 Foeu
 The Initiation (Origine d’un Extrême)
 Invasion of the Night
 Théorie de l’Arbre
 Paul Nash
 Battle of Britain
 Totes Meer
 John Petts – Alun Lewis
 Pablo Picasso
 Dora Maar au Chat
 Tete de femme (Dora Maar) (sculpture)
 Horace Pippin – Self-portrait
 Albin Polasek – Masaryk Memorial, Chicago
 Victor Vasarely – Untitled
 Carel Weight
 Escape of the Zebra from the Zoo during an Air Raid
 It happened to us – daylight raid

Births
April 13 – Jean-Marc Reiser, French comics artist (d. 1983)
May 23 – Martin Puryear, American sculptor
June 7  – Tony Ray-Jones, English photographer (d. 1972)
July 12 – Richard Tuttle, American postminimalist sculptor, painter and installation artist
July 22 – Vaughn Bodē, American underground comix, graphic design and graffiti artist (d. 1975)
August 29 – Ugo Nespolo, Italian painter and filmmaker
September 20 – Dale Chihuly, American glass sculptor.
September 24 – Linda McCartney, née Eastman, American music photographer (d. 1998)
December 6 – Bruce Nauman, American installation and video artist
December 31 – Robert Lenkiewicz, English painter (d. 2002)
 date unknown
 Mary Kelly, American conceptual artist
 James Coleman, Irish installation and video artist
 Irene Avaalaaqiaq Tiktaalaaq, Canadian Inuit artist

Deaths
January 10 – John Lavery, Irish painter and war artist (b. 1856)
February 6 – Maximilien Luce, French painter (b. 1858)
March 6 – Gutzon Borglum, American sculptor (b. 1867)
March 30 – Bertha Jaques, American etcher (b. 1863)
April 14 – Guillermo Kahlo, German-Mexican photographer (b. 1871)
April 16 – Émile Bernard, French Post-Impressionist painter (b. 1868)
October 25 – Robert Delaunay, French painter (b. 1885)
November 7 – Frank Pick, English transport administrator and patron of art and design (b. 1878)
December 3 – Pavel Filonov, Russian painter and poet (b. 1883)
December 5 – Amrita Sher-Gil, Indian painter (b. 1913)
December 30  – El Lissitzky, Russian designer, architect and photographer (b. 1890)
 date unknown – William Jacob Baer, American miniature painter (b. 1860)

See also
 1941 in fine arts of the Soviet Union

References

 
Years of the 20th century in art
1940s in art